Matthieu Lahaye (born 23 November 1984, in Rennes) is a French racing driver, competing in the FIA World Endurance Championship for OAK Racing.

Career
Lahaye's career began in karting, in which he competed between 1995 and 2001. He then took part in Formula France and French Formula Renault. In 2004 he contested World Series Lights, finishing fifth in the standings with a win at Valenca. He moved on to the Eurocup Mégane Trophy in 2005 for Tech 1 Racing, finishing his first season ninth overall. The following year he won three times on his way to the runner-up spot. 2007 saw him slip to fifth place with just one win.

2008 saw him switch to sportscars, driving in the Le Mans Series for Saulnier Racing. Racing a Pescarolo-Judd with Pierre Ragues, he finished fifth in the LMP2 standings. He also took part in his first 24 Hours of Le Mans with the team together with Ragues and China's Congfu Cheng, finishing 18th overall and third in LMP2.

In 2009 he continued with the team (now renamed OAK Racing) in the LMP2 class of the LMS, with Karim Ajlani as his teammate. They scored two podium finishes from the five races, finishing ninth in the final standings. He and Ajlani were joined at Le Mans by Guillaume Moreau, but the car retired from the race. Lahaye did win the class in the two races at Okayama that made up the 2009 Asian Le Mans Series, partnering team owner Jacques Nicolet and Richard Hein.

In 2010 he partnered Nicolet in the Le Mans Series, and finished the year third in LMP2. At Le Mans he finished seventh overall and second in LMP2, sharing with Moreau and Jan Charouz.

In 2011 he contested the LMP1 category of the Intercontinental Le Mans Cup with OAK. However, a heavy accident in qualifying at Spa left him with two broken vertebrae, a broken hand and an injured knee, and he would miss the 24 Hours of Le Mans.

In 2012 he is competing in the FIA World Endurance Championship in OAK's Morgan LMP2 alongside Nicolet and Olivier Pla.

Racing record

Complete FIA World Endurance Championship results

24 Hours of Le Mans results

References

External links
Official website  
Career statistics at Driver Database

1984 births
Living people
Sportspeople from Rennes
French racing drivers
French Formula Renault 2.0 drivers
Eurocup Mégane Trophy drivers
European Le Mans Series drivers
American Le Mans Series drivers
24 Hours of Le Mans drivers
FIA World Endurance Championship drivers
Asian Le Mans Series drivers
Tech 1 Racing drivers
OAK Racing drivers